is a Japanese writer and co-founder of the visual novel brand Key under Visual Arts. He is considered a pioneer of nakige visual novels, and has mainly contributed as a scenario writer, lyricist, and musical composer for the games the company produces. His style was originally inspired by James Herbert Brennan, and is influenced by Haruki Murakami's novel Hard-Boiled Wonderland and the End of the World.

Originally from Mie, Japan, Maeda graduated from Mie high school and later went on to graduate from Chukyo University with a major in psychology. Before forming Key, Maeda worked for the company Tactics where he had a hand in the creation of two games for that company, Moon and One: Kagayaku Kisetsu e. After forming Key, Maeda has put much work into such titles as Kanon, Air, Clannad, Little Busters!, Angel Beats!, Charlotte, Summer Pockets, and The Day I Became a God. He is also the author of a manga series titled Hibiki's Magic.

Early life
Jun Maeda started writing at a young age; while attending elementary school, Maeda wrote his first amateur gamebook. Maeda was initially inspired by the Grailquest series of gamebooks by J.H. Brennan, especially the first two books in the series The Castle of Darkness and The Den of Dragons which he found to be especially interesting. Through junior-high school, Maeda worked on the school newspaper and even had some short stories published in the paper. Once attending Mie high school, he started to write lyrics and compose music. It was at this time that he became immersed in the fantasy genre of fiction. While attending Chukyo University, Maeda managed to get some short stories published in Kadokawa Shoten's seinen light novel magazine The Sneaker. Finally, when he was writing his graduation thesis, he started listening to techno music.

Career
While still attending university, Maeda sought to begin working as a musical composer for video games, and desired to work at big-name companies like Nihon Falcom Corporation, Namco, and Capcom, but he was unsuccessful. He eventually was able to be granted an interview with the video game developer TGL, but was unable to supply correct documentation, and did not get the job. As he was unable to get a job working with music, Maeda decided to change his occupational choice to that of a scenario writer for a video game company. At the time in the mid-1990s, scenario writers for consumer video games were inexperienced, so Maeda decided to shoot for adult games instead. During a period of one month, Maeda wrote a long, 300-page erotic story, intending to sell it to an adult game developer. He first tried with AliceSoft, makers of the popular Rance series, but finally ended up working for the company Scoop. At Scoop in 1997, he contributed as the main scenario writer for the company's first game, Chaos Queen Ryōko; however, Maeda was not happy with the work environment and promptly filed his resignation with the company shortly after finishing his work on the scenario.

Around this time, Jun Maeda was inspired by Hiroyuki Kanno's pioneering 1996 visual novel YU-NO: A Girl Who Chants Love at the Bound of this World. It demonstrated the storytelling potential of the visual novel medium, and influenced Maeda's later works. After leaving Scoop in 1997, Maeda went to work for the newly formed company Tactics under the publisher Nexton. There, he went to work on the scenario and musical composition of Tactics' second game Moon, followed by his work on the scenario for their third game One: Kagayaku Kisetsu e in 1998. After realizing the positive reception received for both titles, Maeda and much of the staff who made both Moon and One, including Itaru Hinoue, Shinji Orito, Naoki Hisaya, and OdiakeS, left Tactics to work under the video game publishing company VisualArt's where they formed the company Key.

After forming Key, Maeda worked on the music and scenario for their first title Kanon released in 1999, which proved to be very popular in the adult game market in Japan. Beside Maeda, the majority of Kanon scenario was written by Naoki Hisaya, but he quit Key shortly after Kanon was produced. Following this, Maeda wrote most of the scenario for Key's next title Air, along with again working as the lyricist and one of the composers for the music featured in the game. After a period of four years in 2004, Key released their third and longest game Clannad where Maeda did a vast amount of the writing for the game; in all, Maeda put in around 75% of the work that went into the creation of Clannad. Also in 2004, Maeda began writing his first manga entitled Hibiki's Magic, which was first conceived as a short story he wrote as a student. In 2005, Maeda worked on the scenario and music for Key's fifth game Tomoyo After: It's a Wonderful Life, followed by Key's sixth title Little Busters! released in July 2007 which he also worked on in regards to the scenario and music.

Maeda was reported to say in the February 2007 issue of Comptiq that after the completion of Little Busters!, he would not be working on the scenario staff for Key any longer. However, in an interview in the December 2007 issue of Dengeki G's Magazine, Maeda said that he would still be working on the music for Key's next game. In 2007, Maeda also composed the ending theme for the game Himawari no Chapel de Kimi to for the company Marron, and he was on the music staff for Ram's game 5 released in July 2008. Maeda worked in collaboration with Na-Ga and ASCII Media Works' Dengeki G's Magazine to the anime series and mixed media project Angel Beats! as the planner and writer, as well as composing the anime's music. Maeda worked on Key's ninth game Rewrite with the composition of the game's music and as the quality checker.

In 2015, Maeda designed and co-wrote the scenario for the Angel Beats! visual novel, as well as composing some of the game's music. Maeda once again collaborated with Na-Ga, Dengeki G's Magazine, P.A. Works, and Aniplex to produce his second anime series Charlotte in 2015, contributing as the planner, writer, and composing the anime's music. In 2016, Maeda revealed that he is suffering from dilated cardiomyopathy. To recover from this condition, he will need a heart transplant. Maeda is credited for the original concept and the composition of the music for Key's visual novel Summer Pockets. Maeda collaborated with Na-Ga, P.A. Works, and Aniplex for a third time to produce the anime series The Day I Became a God in 2020, contributing as the planner and writer. In 2021, Maeda published his first novel, Nekogarizoku no Osa. His most recent work, Heaven Burns Red, was released in Japan in February 2022 for iOS and Android. It is a turn-based role-playing game with visual novel and gacha game elements created in tandem with Wright Flyer Studios.

Writing themes
As is prevalent in the scenarios Maeda has written for visual novels, there are recurring themes related to the concept of a family and the bonds that hold it together. Most prevalent are the maternal bonds felt between a mother and daughter relationship, as can be seen strongly in Kanon, Air, and Clannad. However, in one of his earliest works, Moon, there was a conflict between the female protagonist and her late mother. Another recurring theme is that of magical realism, or adding fantastical elements into a story that would appear otherwise to be normal, such as with the concept of the illusionary world in Clannad, or the use of magic in Air and supernatural elements in Charlotte. Similarly, the concept of the switching between a real-life setting and the mystical Eternal World from One: Kagayaku Kisetsu e has been compared to Haruki Murakami's novel Hard-Boiled Wonderland and the End of the World, which uses a similar dichotomy between reality and fantasy.

After the production of Moon with its melancholic storylines, Maeda decided to shoot for what has later become known as a "crying game", starting with One: Kagayaku Kisetsu e. A crying game in this sense is a type of bishōjo game which can make the player cry for the characters, and thus give a more profound impact on the players. When working on Kanon with a similar goal, Maeda worked in depressing elements to the two heroines' stories he wrote for: Makoto Sawatari, and Mai Kawasumi.

Musical involvement
Jun Maeda composes and writes lyrics for songs and background music featured in games he works on. At Tactics, he composed a single piece of music for Moon, but did not contribute to the music in One: Kagayaku Kisetsu e. At Key, Maeda has worked on the music for all of Key's titles except for Planetarian: The Reverie of a Little Planet and Rewrite Harvest festa!. He also composed and wrote the lyrics to the ending theme song for the Clannad anime series, and similarly for the opening theme song for the Clannad After Story anime series. Music that Maeda composes for Key titles is published on Key's record label Key Sounds Label. On the label, Maeda produced three singles and one album where he wrote and composed all the songs which include: "Natsukage / Nostalgia", "Birthday Song,Requiem", "Spica/Hanabi/Moon", and Love Song; the songs on the first three were sung by Lia and the fourth was sung by Riya.

Maeda wrote and composed the two songs "Doll", performed separately by Lia and Aoi Tada, and "Human", performed by Lia; both versions of "Doll" were used as the main ending theme songs for the second season of the anime series Gunslinger Girl in 2008, while "Human" was used for the final episode. Maeda's first involvement as a main composer was with the 2008 visual novel 5 by Ram where he composed about twenty background music tracks. Maeda also wrote and composed the opening and ending themes used in 5. Maeda formed his own record label named Flaming June in 2011, and the first release on the label is the single "Killer Song" by Nagi Yanagi released in December 2011. Flaming June released an original concept album with Yanagi on April 25, 2012 titled Owari no Hoshi no Love Song. Maeda released the concept album Long Long Love Song featuring Anri Kumaki on July 26, 2017. In 2021, Maeda wrote and composed one song for The Idolmaster Cinderella Girls: Starlight Stage titled "Beat of the Night", performed by Kaoru Sakura. Maeda wrote and composed the opening theme song for the 2022 anime series Prima Doll, titled "Tin Toy Melody".

References

External links
  
 Key's official website 
 Key Sounds Label official website 
 Flaming June official website 
 
 

1975 births
Anime composers
Hentai creators
Interactive fiction writers
Japanese composers
Japanese film score composers
Japanese male composers
Japanese male film score composers
Japanese songwriters
Japanese video game designers
Japanese writers
Key (company)
Living people
Video game composers
Writers from Mie Prefecture